The 2010 MercedesCup was a men's tennis tournament played on outdoor clay courts. It was the 32nd edition of the Stuttgart Open and was part of the ATP World Tour 250 series of the 2010 ATP World Tour. It was held at the Tennis Club Weissenhof in Stuttgart, Germany from 12 July until 18 July 2010. Fifth-seeded Albert Montañés won the singles title.

ATP entrants

Seeds

Seedings are based on the rankings of July 5, 2010.

Other entrants
The following players received wildcards into the singles main draw
  Dustin Brown
  Björn Phau
  Mischa Zverev

The following players received entry from the qualifying draw:
  Pablo Andújar
  Victor Crivoi
  Bastian Knittel
  Iván Navarro

Finals

Singles

 Albert Montañés defeated  Gaël Monfils, 6–2, 1–2, RET.
It was Montañés' 2nd title of the year and 5th of his career.

Doubles

 Carlos Berlocq /  Eduardo Schwank defeated  Christopher Kas /  Philipp Petzschner 7–6(7–5), 7–6(7–6)

References

External links
 Official website 
 ITF tournament edition details
 ATP tournament profile

Stuttgart Open
Stuttgart Open
Stutt